Starsailor is the sixth studio album by Tim Buckley, released on Herb Cohen's Straight Records label in November 1970. Starsailor marks the moment Buckley's folk rock origins became invisible as he fully incorporated jazz rock and avant-garde styles into his music. Although it alienated elements of his fanbase upon release, it also contains his best known song, "Song to the Siren". This more accessible song was written much earlier than Starsailor'''s newer material, originally in a more traditional folk arrangement, as shown on the later released compilation album Morning Glory: The Tim Buckley Anthology. Bunk Gardner, a former member of the Mothers of Invention, joined Buckley's normal band to record the album. Also, Buckley began working again with lyricist Larry Beckett, after a three-album hiatus.

Leontyne Price attended a concert in New York City during the supporting tour and told Buckley, "Boy, I wish they were writing things like that for us opera singers," to which Buckley responded, "Well, do what I did; get your own band."

"Starsailor" is a literal English rendering of the Greek-derived word "astronaut."

Renewed interest
"Song to the Siren" has been covered by a variety of artists, most notably by This Mortal Coil, which featured on their 1984 album It'll End in Tears. John Frusciante, in 2009, covered this song on his album The Empyrean. Amen Dunes covered the song on their 2015 EP release Cowboy Worship. The British trance act Lost Witness also released a remix single, entitled "Did I Dream (Song to the Siren)".

While the revival of "Song to the Siren" renewed interest in Buckley amongst independent artists in the 1980s, the success of his estranged son, Jeff Buckley, in the 1990s, inspired indie rock artists to look at the career of his father. The British band Starsailor took their name from this album.

The album had a brief reissue on CD by the Enigma Retro label, but like the other Tim Buckley release on the Straight Records label (1969's Blue Afternoon), it drifted out of print due to legal battles over who owned the rights to the music. This stems back to a 1976 separation and lawsuit between Herb Cohen and Frank Zappa, the co-owners of Straight Records. As a result, many of the albums released on Straight (including Captain Beefheart's Lick My Decals Off, Baby) are very difficult to find on CD. In 2006, the album was released on the iTunes Music Store, making it available to the general public once more. In 2007, 4 Men With Beards reissued the album on vinyl, as well as the rest of Tim Buckley's nine-album catalogue. However, CD copies of this and Blue Afternoon remained out of print and difficult to find on the market until the release in 2017 of The Complete Album Collection box set.

Reception and legacyStarsailor was featured at #50 in Pitchfork's 2004 list of The 100 Best Albums of the 1970s. Reviewer Dominique Leone said of the album, "Starsailor is a masterpiece in every sense. It captured its maker at his freest and most willing to throw caution and sales to the wind, while simultaneously at his most creative and most capable of pulling off songs and moods that, from practically anyone else, would sound cartoonish, clumsy and confused."

In addition, Starsailor was selected as the 47th best rock record of all time in the 1987 book The Top 100 Rock 'n' Roll Albums of All Time.

In 2000 it was voted number 507 in Colin Larkin's All Time Top 1000 Albums''.

Track listing
All music written by Tim Buckley.

Personnel
Musicians
Maury Baker – percussion
John Balkin – double bass, electric bass
Tim Buckley – guitar, 12-string guitar, vocals
Bunk Gardner – alto flute, tenor saxophone
Buzz Gardner – trumpet, flugelhorn
Lee Underwood – guitar, piano, pipe organ

Technical
Tim Buckley – producer
Stan Agol – engineer
Herb Cohen – executive producer

Visual
Ed Thrasher – art direction and photography
L.J. Moche – repackaging for 1989 remastered CD version

References

Tim Buckley albums
1970 albums
Straight Records albums
Enigma Records albums